Keith Moore "Red" Mitchell (September 20, 1927 – November 8, 1992) was an American jazz double-bassist, composer, lyricist, and poet.

Biography
Mitchell was born in New York City.   His younger brother, Whitey Mitchell, also became a jazz bassist.

Mitchell was raised in New Jersey by a father who was an engineer and loved music, and a mother who loved poetry.  His first instruments were piano, alto saxophone, and clarinet. Although Cornell University awarded him an engineering scholarship, by 1947 he was in the U.S. Army playing bass. The next year, he was in a jazz trio in New York City.

Mitchell performed and/or recorded with Mundell Lowe, Chubby Jackson, Charlie Ventura, Woody Herman, Red Norvo, Gerry Mulligan, and, after joining the West Coast jazz scene in the early 1950s, with André Previn, Shelly Manne, Hampton Hawes, Billie Holiday, Stan Seltzer, Ornette Coleman, and others such as Mahalia Jackson. He also worked as a bassist in television and film studios around Los Angeles, occasionally appearing on screen. Mitchell also appeared in documentaries about Tal Farlow and Zoot Sims.

Saxophonist Harold Land and Mitchell founded and co-led a quintet in the early 1960s.

Mitchell moved to Stockholm in 1968. He won Sweden's Grammis Award in 1986 and again in 1991, for his recorded performances as a pianist, bassist, and vocalist, and for his compositions and poetic song lyrics.

During this period, Mitchell performed and/or recorded with Clark Terry, Lee Konitz, Herb Ellis, Jim Hall, Joe Pass, Kenny Barron, Hank Jones, Ben Webster, Bill Mays, Warne Marsh, Jimmy Rowles, Phil Woods, Roger Kellaway, Putte Wickman and others.  He frequently collaborated in duos, most notably with pianist Kellaway after the mid-1980s.

The Swedish government awarded Mitchell the Illis quorum in 1992.

Returning to the United States in early 1992, Mitchell settled in Oregon, where he died of a stroke at age 65 on November 8, 1992.

A collection of his poetry was published posthumously.  His widow is preparing a biography.

Technique and playing style
Mitchell used standard tuning during the 1950s and for the first half of the 1960s, and produced sound similar to his professional jazz bass peers. However, "in 1966 he switched to cello tuning on his bass (C-G-D-A, an octave below the cello, instead of the standard E-A-D-G). At the same time, he began adjusting the tone controls of his amplifier to create a soft, unfocused sound in the lowest notes and to emphasize the upper harmonics in higher notes. The result was an airy tone quality that sounded gentle, not muscular. This airy tone and his frequent habit of strumming the strings with his right thumb contributed greatly to his unusual style."

Discography

As leader/co-leader
 Happy Minors (Bethlehem, 1955) 10" LP with Bob Brookmeyer and Zoot Sims
 Red Mitchell (Bethlehem, 1956)
 Presenting Red Mitchell (Contemporary, 1957)
 Get Those Elephants Out'a Here (MetroJazz, 1958) with Whitey Mitchell, Blue Mitchell and André Previn
 Rejoice! (Disques Vogue, 1961)
 Hear Ye! (Atlantic, 1962) by the Red Mitchell-Harold Land Quintet
 One Long String (Mercury, 1969)
 Bästisar! (Artist, 1973) with Evabritt Strandberg
 Two Way Conversation (Sonet, 1974) with Barney Kessel
 I Concentrate on You: A Tribute to Cole Porter (SteepleChase, 1974) with Lee Konitz
 Chocolate Cadillac with Horace Parlan, Nisse Sandstrom, Rune Carlsson, Idrees Sulieman, 1976
 But Three's a Crowd (Bluebell, 1977) with Karin Krog
 Blues for a Crushed Soul (Sonet, 1978)
 Jim Hall/Red Mitchell (Artists House, 1978) with Jim Hall
 Valse Hot: Sweet Basil 1978 (ArtistShare released 2016) with Jim Hall
 Scairport Blues (Yupiteru, 1978)
 Red'n Me (All Life, 1979) with Jimmy Rowles
 What I Am (Caprice, 1979)
 Bass Club (Paddle Wheel, 1980) with Isao Suzuki and Tsuyoshi Yamamoto
 You're Me (Phontastic, 1980) with Tommy Flanagan
 Empathy (Gryphon, 1980) with Joe Beck
 Three for All (Enja, 1981) with Phil Woods and Tommy Flanagan
 When I'm Singing, (1982, Enja)
 Simple Isn't Easy, 1983
 Home Suite, 1985
 To Duke and Basie (Enja, 1986) with Clark Terry
The Red Barron Duo (Storyville, 1986 [1988]) with Kenny Barron
 Duo with Hank Jones (Timeless, 1987)
 Fifty/Fifty (Stash Records, 1987) with Roger Kellaway
 Jive at Five (Enja, 1988) with Clark Terry
 Alone Together (Dragon, 1988) with Roger Kellaway
 Mitchell's Talking with Ben Riley, Kenny Barron, 1989
 Blaus with Jan Johannsson, 1992
 Life's a Take (Concord Jazz, 1993 [Concord Duo Series, Vol. 1; recorded 1992]) with Roger Kellaway
 Evolution with Lars Jansson, Joakim Milder, 1995
 Live in Stockholm with Roger Kellaway, Joakim Milder, 1995
 Red Mitchell-Warne Marsh Big Two, Vol. 2 with Warne Marsh, 1998
 Live at Port Townsend with George Cables, (1992), 2005

As sideman
With Billie Holiday
Live in Europe 1954 (Blue Note, 1990s)
With Mose Allison
I've Been Doin' Some Thinkin' (Atlantic, 1968)
With Gene Ammons
Gene Ammons in Sweden (Enja, 1973 [1981])
With Chet Baker
Chet Baker Sings and Plays (Pacific Jazz, 1955)
With Louis Bellson
Music, Romance and Especially Love (Verve, 1957)
With Paul Bley
Live at Sweet Basil (Soul Note, 1988)
With Bob Brookmeyer
Bob Brookmeyer Quartet (Pacific Jazz, 1954)
With Red Callender
The Lowest (MetroJazz, 1958) 
With Buddy Collette
Jazz Loves Paris (Specialty, 1958)
At the Cinema! (Mercury, 1959)
With Tony Crombie
Rockin' with the Rockets – 1958 (Columbia (UK:33S1108) (10") - (Red Morris, Jimmy Currie, Ashley Kozak, Clyde Ray (vocals)
With Maynard Ferguson
Dimensions (EmArcy, 1955)
With Tommy Flanagan
Super-Session (Enja, 1980) with Elvin Jones
With Jimmy Giuffre
7 Pieces (Verve, 1959)
Ad Lib (Verve, 1959)
With Jim Hall
Jazz Guitar (Pacific Jazz, 1957)
Good Friday Blues (Pacific Jazz, 1960) as The Modest Jazz Trio
With Herbie Harper
Five Brothers (Tampa, 1955)
With Hampton Hawes
Hampton Hawes Trio (Contemporary, 1955)
This Is Hampton Hawes (Contemporary, 1956)
Everybody Likes Hampton Hawes (Contemporary, 1956)
 All Night Session! Vol. 1 (Contemporary, 1956 [1958])
 All Night Session! Vol. 2 (Contemporary, 1956 [1958])
 All Night Session! Vol. 3 (Contemporary, 1956 [1958])
Four! (Contemporary, 1958)
The Seance (Contemporary, 1966 [1969])
I'm All Smiles (Contemporary, 1966 [1973])
With Paul Horn 
House of Horn (Dot, 1957)
Plenty of Horn (Dot, 1958)
With Stan Kenton
Kenton with Voices (Capitol, 1957)
Lush Interlude (Capitol, 1958)
Sophisticated Approach (Capitol, 1961)
With Barney Kessel
Kessel Plays Standards (Contemporary, 1955)
To Swing or Not to Swing (Contemporary, 1955)
Easy Like (Contemporary, 1956)
With Karin Krog
I Remember You... (Spotlite, 1981) with Warne Marsh
With Johnny Mandel 
I Want to Live (United Artists, 1958)
With Shelly Manne
Bells Are Ringing (Contemporary, 1958)
With Warne Marsh
Music for Prancing (Mode, 1957)
With Gil Mellé
Gil Mellé Quintet/Sextet (Blue Note, 1953)
With Jack Montrose
Arranged/Played/Composed by Jack Montrose (Atlantic, 1955)
With Gerry Mulligan 
Paris Concert (Pacific Jazz, 1955)
California Concerts (Pacific Jazz, 1955)
I Want to Live (United Artists, 1958)
With Bill Perkins and Richie Kamuca
Tenors Head-On (Liberty, 1957)
With André Previn
Pal Joey (Contemporary, 1957)
 Gigi (Contemporary, 1958)
King Size! (Contemporary, 1959)
 West Side Story (Contemporary, 1959)
The Subterraneans (Soundtrack) (MGM, 1960)
André Previn and J. J. Johnson (Columbia, 1961) with J.J. Johnson
Sessions, Live (Calliope, 1978) recorded 1956–57
A Different Kind of Blues (Angel, 1980) with Itzhak Perlman
It's a Breeze (Angel, 1981) with Itzhak Perlman
With Shorty Rogers
Shorty Rogers Plays Richard Rodgers (RCA Victor, 1957)
An Invisible Orchard (RCA Victor, 1961 [1997])
The Fourth Dimension in Sound (Warner Bros., 1961)
With Dick Rosmini
Adventures for 12-String, 6-String and Banjo (Elektra, 1964)
With Pete Rugolo
The Music from Richard Diamond (EmArcy, 1959)
10 Trombones Like 2 Pianos (Mercury, 1960)
The Original Music of Thriller (Time, 1961)
10 Saxophones and 2 Basses (Mercury, 1961)
With George Russell
Electronic Sonata for Souls Loved by Nature (Flying Dutchman, 1969)
With Bud Shank
Bud Shank - Shorty Rogers - Bill Perkins (Pacific Jazz, 1955)
With Zoot Sims
In a Sentimental Mood (Sonet, 1985)
With Pierre Strom
Rallarvisor (YTF Records, 1973)
With Clark Terry
Out of Nowhere (Bingow, 1978)
Brahms Lullabye (Bingow, 1978)
Funk Dumplin's (Matrix, 1978)
With Cal Tjader
West Side Story (Fantasy, 1960)
The Prophet (Verve, 1968)
With Ben Webster
Ben Webster at the Renaissance (Contemporary, 1960)
With Magni Wentzel
New York Nights (Gemini, 1992)
’’’With Joe Sample’’’
’’Fancy Dance’’ (Sonet, 1969)

References

External links
 
 Red Mitchell at EMusic

1927 births
1992 deaths
Musicians from New York City
Cool jazz double-bassists
West Coast jazz double-bassists
American jazz composers
American male jazz composers
American jazz double-bassists
Male double-bassists
American emigrants to Sweden
Riverside Records artists
Enja Records artists
Gemini Records artists
20th-century American composers
Jazz musicians from New York (state)
20th-century double-bassists
20th-century American male musicians
20th-century jazz composers
SteepleChase Records artists
Sonet Records artists
ArtistShare artists
Concord Records artists
Recipients of the Illis quorum